Julie Hart Beers Kempson (1835 – August 13, 1913) was an American landscape painter associated with the Hudson River School who was one of the very few commercially successful professional women landscape painters of her day.

Life
Born Julie Hart in Pittsfield, Massachusetts, she was the daughter of James Hart and Marion (Robertson) Hart, who had immigrated from Scotland in 1831. Her older brothers William Hart and James McDougal Hart were also important landscape painters of the Hudson River School, and her nieces Letitia Bonnet Hart and Mary Theresa Hart became well-known painters as well.

In 1853, she married journalist George Washington Beers. After his death in 1856 she and her two daughters moved to New York City, where her brothers had their studios. Like most women artists of the day, she had no formal art education, but it is thought that she was trained by her brothers.

Well into her forties, with her second husband, Peter Kempson, she moved to Metuchen, New Jersey, where she set up her own studio. She continued to use the surname Beers when signing her artwork.

At the time of her death she was living in Trenton.

Career
By 1867, Beers was exhibiting her paintings. Although she had her own studio in New Jersey, she continued to use William's studio on 10th Street in New York City as a showroom. She was one of very few women to become a professional landscape painter in the America of her day, in part because women were excluded from formal art education and exhibition opportunities.

Beers's mature style balances sweeping, well-balanced compositions with telling details. In the 1870s and 1880s, she exhibited frequently at the National Academy of Design as well as at the Brooklyn Art Association, the Boston Athenæum, and the Pennsylvania Academy of Fine Arts. She was able to sell a good deal of work through the Brooklyn Art Association, but she also took groups of women on sketching trips to the mountains of New York and New England to supplement her income.

She also painted some still lifes.

References

1835 births
1913 deaths
Hudson River School painters
19th-century American women artists
19th-century American painters
American landscape painters
People from Pittsfield, Massachusetts
American women painters
Painters from Massachusetts